Mad about Physics: Brainteasers, Paradoxes, and Curiosities is a book written by Christopher Jargocki and Franklin Potter (2001, published by Wiley) containing puzzles and their solutions. It covers Mechanics, Electricity, Magnetism and Optics, as well as the physics of sports, space exploration and astronomy. It has been translated into seven languages, including German, Greek, Japanese and Chinese. As of 2013, it is in its 10th reprinting.

Content

The book contains nearly 400 questions, and marginalia, including jokes, anecdotes, offbeat scientific facts and unusual quotations ranging from Einstein on the sensation of the mystical to Bugs Bunny on the law of Gravity.

Reception and Reviews
A number of reviews discuss Mad about Physics.
 
Peter Ford, a physicist at the University of Bath in the UK, called Mad about Physics "an interesting new book." He wrote that "many of its problems will be useful for teachers, both at senior level in schools and at universities, for discussion with students in small groups. Such tutorials should be used to encourage students to start talking about physics and 'thinking like a physicist.'"

Carol Ryback wrote, "Here's a quick fix for those brain-teasing inquiries that stick in your mind like an old song. While not limited to astronomy-related trivia, 'Mad about Physics"—like a top-40 countdown on the radio – has an allure that makes you want more."

Awards
In 2002, Mad about Physics was selected by the New York Public Library as one of the best titles of the year 2001 in the teen books and media category.

See also
Cognitive dissonance
Paradox

References

External links
 New York Public Library (link to NYPL's list of best 2001 titles in teen books and media)
 Wiley and Sons, Inc. (link to Mad about Physics page)

Popular physics books
Astronomy books
Publications established in 2001